Yedikule Anatolian High School is a public high school situated in the Yedikule neighborhood of Fatih, Istanbul, Turkey. It was founded in 1968.

See also
 List of schools in Istanbul

High schools in Istanbul
Educational institutions established in 1968
1968 establishments in Turkey
Fatih
Anatolian High Schools